The United States Olympic Trials are competitions held in certain sports to select the United States' participants in those sports at the Olympic Games. These events include:
United States Olympic Trials (curling)
United States Olympic Trials (diving)
United States Olympic Trials (gymnastics)
United States Olympic Trials (swimming)
United States Olympic Trials (track and field)
United States Olympic Trials (short track)
United States Olympic Trials (speed skating)